Březina is a municipality and village in Brno-Country District in the South Moravian Region of the Czech Republic. It has about 300 inhabitants.

History
From 1986 to 1990, the formerly sovereign municipality of Březina was a part of Tišnov Since 24 November 1990, Březina is a separate municipality again.

References

Villages in Brno-Country District